Little Dorrit is a novel by Charles Dickens, originally published in serial form between 1855 and 1857. The story features Amy Dorrit, youngest child of her family, born and raised in the Marshalsea prison for debtors in London. Arthur Clennam encounters her after returning home from a 20-year absence, ready to begin his life anew.

The novel satirises some shortcomings of both government and society, including the institution of debtors' prisons, where debtors were imprisoned, unable to work and yet incarcerated until they had repaid their debts. The prison in this case is the Marshalsea, where Dickens's own father had been imprisoned. Dickens is also critical of the impotent bureaucracy of the British government, in this novel in the form of the fictional "Circumlocution Office". Dickens also satirises the stratification of society that results from the British class system.

Plot summary

Poverty
The novel begins in Marseilles "thirty years ago" (c. 1826), with the notorious murderer Rigaud narrating to his prison cellmate John Baptist Cavalletto how he had killed his wife, just prior to being taken to trial. Businessman Arthur Clennam is detained with other travellers in quarantine in Marseilles and becomes friends with the merchants Mr and Mrs Meagles, their spoiled daughter "Pet", and their maid, an orphan named Harriet Beadle, who the family has nicknamed Tattycoram. Another traveller, Miss Wade, takes interest in the rebellious Tattycoram. Arthur has spent the last twenty years in China with his father, handling that part of the family business; his father died recently there. Arthur is now returning to London to see his mother, Mrs Clennam.

While Arthur's father was on his deathbed, he had given Arthur a watch to give to his mother with a message inside, while murmuring "Your mother," which Arthur delivers to Mrs Clennam. Inside the watch casing is an old silk paper with the initials DNF (do not forget) worked in beads. Arthur asks about the message, but the implacable Mrs Clennam, who now uses a wheelchair, refuses to tell him what it means. Arthur tells her that he will not continue in the family business and seeks new opportunity on his own. Jeremiah Flintwinch then presses Mrs Clennam on her failure to tell Arthur of the past.

In London, William Dorrit, imprisoned as a debtor, has been a resident of Marshalsea debtors' prison for over twenty years. He has three children: Edward (known as Tip), Fanny and Amy. The youngest daughter, Amy, was born in the prison and is affectionately known as Little Dorrit. Their mother died when Amy was eight years old. Tip has recently been imprisoned for his own gambling debts and the ambitious Fanny lives outside the prison with William's older brother Frederick. She works as a dancing girl in the musical hall where Frederick plays the clarinet and has attracted the attention of the wealthy but insipid Edmund Sparkler. Little Dorrit, devoted to her father, supports them both through her sewing and is free to pass in and out of the prison. To the honour of her father, who is embarrassed to acknowledge his financial position, Little Dorrit avoids mentioning her work outside the prison or his inability to leave. Mr Dorrit assumes the role of Father of the Marshalsea, and is held in great respect by its inhabitants, as if he had chosen to live there.

After Arthur tells his mother that he will not continue in the family business, Mrs Clennam chooses her clerk Jeremiah Flintwinch as her partner. When Arthur learns that Mrs Clennam employs Little Dorrit as a seamstress, showing unusual kindness, he wonders whether the young girl might be connected with the mystery of the watch. Arthur follows the girl to the Marshalsea. He tries in vain to enquire about William Dorrit's debt in the Circumlocution Office, assuming the role of benefactor towards Little Dorrit, her father, and her brother, but is unable to make any progress. Meanwhile, Rigaud, who has been released for lack of evidence, approaches Mrs Clennam under the name Blandois, and blackmails her and Flintwhich into giving him a place in her business.

While at the Circumlocution Office Arthur meets the successful inventor Daniel Doyce. Doyce wants a partner and man of business at his factory and Arthur agrees to fill that role. Arthur encounters Cavalletto, when he is injured by a carriage in London, and aids him in getting medical care. Cavaletto lives in hopes of never again seeing Blandois. Little Dorrit falls in love with Arthur, but Arthur fails to recognise Little Dorrit's feelings. He is infatuated with Pet Meagles, but is disappointed when she marries the handsome but cruel artist Henry Gowan. Shortly after Pet's wedding, the Meagles family suffers a blow when Tattycoram runs away to live with Miss Wade.

Arthur becomes reacquainted with his former fiancée Flora Finching, the reason he was sent away to China, who is now a widow and who takes care of the aunt of her late husband. Her father Mr Casby owns many rental properties, and his rent collector, Mr Pancks, takes the brunt of the dirty work of collecting Casby's inflated rents. The indefatigable Pancks discovers that William Dorrit is the lost heir to a large fortune, enabling him to pay his way out of prison, altering the status of the entire family. Dorrit, restored to wealth, immediately shuns all reminders of his past, and forbids a heartbroken Little Dorrit from seeing Arthur again.

Riches
The now wealthy Dorrits decide that they should tour Europe as a newly respectable rich family. They travel over the Alps and take up residence for a time in Venice, and finally in Rome, displaying pride over their new-found wealth and position, unwilling to tell their past to new friends. Little Dorrit finds it difficult to adjust to their wealth and new social position, but only her uncle Frederick shares her feelings. Fanny and Tip adjust rapidly to the ways of society, as does Mr Dorrit, yet he fears that someone will discover the truth of his past spent in the Marshalsea, a story he would rather remains in the past. In Rome, at a party, Mr Dorrit falls ill, and dies at their lodgings. His distraught brother Frederick dies that same night. Little Dorrit, left alone, returns to London to stay with newly married Fanny and her husband, the dim-witted Edmund Sparkler. Meanwhile, Blandois disappears and Mrs Clennam is suspected of his murder.

The Financial collapse

The financial house of Merdle, Edmund Sparkler's stepfather, ends with Merdle's suicide; the collapse of his bank and investment businesses takes with it the savings of the Dorrits, the firm of Doyce and Clennam, Arthur Clennam, and Pancks. Pancks feels enormous guilt for persuading Clennam that the financial man of the hour, Merdle, was an investment, not speculation as Clennam judges. Ashamed and unable to pay the business debts, Clennam is now imprisoned in the Marshalsea, where he becomes ill. When Little Dorrit arrives in London, she slowly nurses him back to health.

Cavalletto tracks down Blandois at the request of Arthur, and brings him to Arthur at the Marshalsea. The truth of Mrs Clennam's past is revealed by Blandois and confirmed by Jeremiah when both are with Mrs Clennam at her house on the appointed day one week after the meeting in the Marshalsea. Her marriage was arranged by her parents and his uncle, though Clennam's uncle Gilbert knew his nephew had already married. Mrs Clennam had insisted on bringing up little Arthur and denying his biological mother, his father's first wife, the right to see him. Mrs Clennam feels this is her right to punish others, under the guise of her religion. She was hurt and used her power to hurt others.

Arthur's biological mother died about the same time as Arthur went off to China; in her younger life, she joined a house of artistic people in London. Mr Clennam's wealthy uncle Gilbert, stung by remorse, had left a bequest to Arthur's biological mother and to the youngest daughter of her patron, or if no daughter, the youngest child of his brother, while Arthur was away in China with his father. The patron was Frederick Dorrit, the kind musician who had taught and befriended Arthur's biological mother, and the beneficiary is his niece, Amy Dorrit. After prodding Mrs Clennam to tell the truth, which she refuses to do, Jeremiah gave the papers with this codicil to the uncle's will to his twin brother, the night that Arthur arrived home, while telling Mrs Clennam that he had burned the papers on the next day.

Blandois left a copy of the papers he obtained from Jeremiah's brother at the Marshalsea for Little Dorrit.

Mrs Clennam fails to tell Little Dorrit of her inheritance or give it to her, though she hires her for seamstress work, and she fails to tell Arthur about his biological mother, though Arthur had sensed that his father had some past burden on his mind even as he died. Unwilling to yield to blackmail by Blandois and with some remorse, the rigid woman rises from her chair and totters out of her house to reveal the secrets to Little Dorrit at the Marshalsea. Mrs Clennam begs her forgiveness, which the kind-hearted girl freely grants. Returning to home, Mrs Clennam falls in the street, never to recover the use of her speech or limbs, as the house of Clennam literally collapses before her eyes, killing Blandois. Affery was outdoors seeking her mistress, and Jeremiah had escaped London before the collapse with as much money as he could find. Rather than hurt him, Little Dorrit chooses not to reveal the will that was meant to benefit her to Arthur, but will tell him about his parents after his mother dies.

Mr Meagles seeks the original papers, stopping in France to ask Miss Wade. She has them but denies it. Tattycoram, who has suffered under Miss Wade's sadistic temperament, follows Meagles back to London with the papers and presents them to him. He gives them to Little Dorrit. When Arthur is well and they are about to marry, Little Dorrit asks him to burn the papers. Mr Meagles then seeks out Arthur's business partner Daniel Doyce from abroad. Doyce returns a wealthy and successful man, who arranges to clear all debts for Arthur's release. Arthur is released from the prison with his fortunes revived, his position secure with Doyce, and his health restored. Arthur and Little Dorrit marry.

Sub-plots
Little Dorrit contains numerous sub-plots. One concerns Arthur Clennam's friends, the kind-hearted Meagles family, who are upset when their daughter Pet marries the artist Henry Gowan, and when their servant and foster daughter Tattycoram is lured away from them to the sinister Miss Wade, an acquaintance of the criminal Rigaud. Miss Wade is ruled by her anger, and she was a jilted sweetheart of Gowan. Another subplot concerns the Italian man John Baptist Cavalletto who was the cellmate of Rigaud in Marseilles, though jailed for a minor crime. He makes his way to London, meets up by chance with Clennam, who stands security for him as he builds up his business in wood carving and gains acceptance among the residents of Bleeding Heart Yard. Cavalletto repays this aid by searching for Blandois/Rigaud when Arthur wants him found. This action brings about the revelation of the secrets kept by Mrs Clennam.

The other major subplot is the satire of British bureaucracy, named as the Circumlocution Office, where the expertise is how not to do it.

Characters
Rigaud: European man who is in prison in Marseilles awaiting trial for murdering his wife. He demands that others treat him as a gentleman, though he does not treat others as a gentleman would. He is also known as Lagnier in an inn in France after he persuades the jury he is not guilty, while most of France knows he was guilty. In England he is known as Blandois, with a plan of blackmail.
John Baptist Cavalletto: Italian man awaiting trial for minor smuggling in Marseilles, and put in the same cell with Rigaud. He makes his way to England, settling in Bleeding Heart Yard, from his connection with Arthur Clennam.
Arthur Clennam: Returning from China, he spent weeks in quarantine in Marseilles, having traveled through a place with plague. He is 40 years old single, and meets new friends in the quarantine. He is a man of honour and kindness, with skills in business.
Mrs Clennam: Wife of Arthur Clennam's father, who ran the family business in London. She was raised in a strict and harsh religious sect and keeps up the ways of her childhood. She kept Arthur with her in London until he was caught with a girlfriend, and both she and the girl's parents disapproved of the connection. She sent him away to work with his father in China.
Mr Gilbert Clennam: Uncle to the father of Arthur Clennam, and who started the family business. He forced Arthur's father, whom he raised, to give up the marriage he made to marry a woman of the uncle's choosing. Gilbert Clennam is not alive in the time of this story, but 40 years earlier, when Arthur was born.
The biological mother of Arthur Clennam: She is never named in the story, except as Arthur's biological mother and the first wife of his father. She was pushed away by Mrs Clennam and Gilbert Clennam. 
Affery: Later Mrs Flintwinch. She takes care of Mrs Clennam and of Arthur before he went to China. She is afraid of both her husband and her mistress. She hears the sounds of the building, all mysterious to her.
Mr Jeremiah Flintwinch: Clerk to the Clennam business until Arthur announces that he will not work in the family business on his return to London. Mr Flintwinch is raised up to be partner with Mrs Clennam. When Mrs Clennam became an invalid needing much care, she decided that Flintwinch and Affery should marry, so they did. After the blackmail attempt, he fled London and was said to be known as Mynheer von Flyntevynge in Amsterdam and The Hague.
Mr Meagles: He is an Englishman travelling in Europe with his wife, daughter and the maid for his daughter. He is a retired banker. He and his family are held in quarantine at Marseilles, having travelled through an area with plague, though none are ill. He becomes friends with Arthur Clennam.
Mrs Meagles: Wife of Mr Meagles and mother of their daughter.
Minnie Meagles: Daughter of Mr and Mrs Meagles, survivor of twin girls. She is a beautiful young woman, spoiled by her parents, and known as Pet to them.
Tattycoram: Maid to Minnie Meagles. She was an orphan taken in by the Meagles. She is younger than Minnie, with rich dark hair, and has a temperament that can run to anger. Her name was Harriet Beadle. She lives with the family in Twickenham, then with Miss Wade in London and in Calais until she returns to the Meagles.
Miss Wade: Another traveller held in quarantine in Marseilles. She is aloof, but makes a connection with Tattycoram. She once was wooed by Henry Gowan. She is linked with Rigaud, as he left the valuable box of Clennam family papers with her.
Mr William Dorrit: About thirty years before the story begins, he enters the debtors' prison called the Marshalsea with his wife and two children. Over time he becomes the "Father of the Marshalsea", based on his social ways, maintaining the expectations of the class in which he was raised. He makes no efforts to resolve the situation that put him in the prison.
Mrs Dorrit: She arrived at the prison a day after her husband, with their two children. She was pregnant, and about seven months later gave birth to their third child and second daughter. Mrs Dorrit died when the girl was about eight years old.
Edward Dorrit: The eldest child of the Dorrits, also called Tip, who enters the prison at about age three. He grows up to become a gambler.
Fanny Dorrit: The elder daughter of the Dorrits, who enters the prison at age two. She grows to be an attractive and active young woman, who takes training in dancing for the theatre. Later she marries Edmund Sparkler.
Amy Dorrit: She was born in the prison, and is called Little Dorrit. She grows up as a girl who cares for others, with a tender heart and is practical as to getting enough money to eat and live with her father in the prison, the emotional and practical centre of her family. She is 22 years old when the story opens.
Frederick Dorrit: Elder brother of William, uncle to Edward, Fanny and Amy. He is artistic, and he plays a musical instrument to support himself since the family finances fell apart. He does not have the same character as his younger brother. In his younger days, he had a house for artistic people, and took in the mother of Arthur Clennam who was a singer.
Young John Chivery: He is the son of John Chivery, who hopes to hand over his position on the lock at the Marshalsea Prison in due time. Young John is in love with Little Dorrit, but his feelings are not returned. He acts to aid her when he can, including helping Pancks in the "fortune teller" task of linking the Dorrits to their inheritance.
Mrs Finching: Now a widow, in her young days Flora was in love with Arthur Clennam. When he returns to England, she maintains a hope that he will fall in love with her again, though she has changed greatly. She adds humour when she enters a scene, never able to address Arthur as Mr Clennam, as would be proper in the present. Her father is Mr Casby.
Mr F's aunt: When her husband dies, Mrs Finching inherits the care of his aunt, whose words are spoken with defiance, but are never quite clear to others.
Mr Christopher Casby: Also called The Patriarch, for his deceptively kind appearance, with long grey hair. He pushes for money for himself above all, while maintaining a different image before the world. He owns the property of Bleeding Heart Yard, and his daughter is Flora.
Mr Pancks: Rent collector for Mr Casby. He becomes friends with Arthur Clennam, and indulges his side interest of matching people with inheritances that belong to them, in which role he calls himself the "fortune teller".
Mr Rugg: Attorney for Mr Pancks and for Doyce & Clennam, also landlord to Pancks. He aided in the "fortune-telling" work to link Dorrits to their inheritance.
Daniel Doyce: He is an inventor of mechanical devices, with a trail of successes in Paris and St Petersburg. He is back in England with vain hopes of getting a patent on a device he invented, and he has a company based in Bleeding Heart Yard. He first meets Arthur Clennam in the Circumlocution Department. He is friends with Mr Meagles, and takes on Arthur Clennam as the man of finances and a partner in his business.
Mr Edmund Sparkler: A dimwitted, upper class, young man who falls for Fanny Dorrit as a dancer. They meet again when the Dorrits are wealthy, and he pursues Fanny until she agrees to marry him. Before Mr Merdle (his "governor") fails, he secures a position for Sparkler in the Circumlocution Office.
Mrs Merdle: Mother of Edmund Sparkler, and remarried to Mr Merdle. She finds her social match in Fanny Dorrit. She is also referred to as 'the Bosom'.
Mr Merdle: In the period of riches for the Dorrits, he is the "man of the age", a banker and financier. News of his success in investments spreads like wildfire, with everyone putting their money with him, or wishing they could. His schemes fail, which is learned after he commits suicide.
Mr Henry Gowan: Handsome young man, related to the Barnacle family, but not closely enough to have more than a small annual income from his mother. He is an artist to earn some money. He pursues Minnie Meagles and marries her around the time that the Dorrits become rich. He is supported financially by his in-laws. The young couple meet the Dorrits while both are touring in Europe.
Mr Tite Barnacle: On staff in the Circumlocution Department in London. He is part of the titled family, the Barnacles. Arthur encounters him in his persistence first to learn the creditor who keeps William Dorrit in debtors' prison, then to get the patent for Doyce's invention, two unsuccessful ventures.
Mr Ferdinand Barnacle: Younger member of the noble family and friends with Henry Gowan. He visits Arthur Clennam at the Marshalsea prison, happy to learn the Circumlocution Office did not put him into the debtors' prison, and tries to explain to Arthur the value of their office doing nothing.
Mr Plornish: Plasterer who lives with his family in Bleeding Heart Yard. He was briefly in the Marshalsea prison, where he met William Dorrit and Little Dorrit. He is a friend to Little Dorrit. Later he and his wife have a store, with funds supplied by William Dorrit before he left England.
Mrs Plornish: Wife of the plasterer and a good friend to John Baptist Cavalletto when he arrives in Bleeding Heart Yard, and a friend to Arthur Clennam. 
Mr Nandy: Father of Mrs Plornish. He lives with his daughter's family when their finances improve. Otherwise, he is forced to live in the poorhouse. He is the one poor man whom William Dorrit allows to visit him. When Little Dorrit walks with him from the Plornish home to the prison, it is a cause of a major row between father and daughter, for being seen with a man from the poorhouse.
Maggy: Young woman left underdeveloped due to disease, who is befriended by Little Dorrit. She calls Little Dorrit her little mother, as Maggy is taller and bigger than Little Dorrit.
Mrs General: Widow hired by William Dorrit to guide his daughters in the ways of society when the family is rich. She is proud never to show any feelings, and always speak calmly. She is well "varnished".
Ephraim Flintwinch: Twin brother of Jeremiah, living in Antwerp. He took in the birth mother of Arthur when Mrs Clennam forced her away, caring for her until her death, about the time that Arthur went off with his father. Before Arthur's return, Jeremiah gave his twin brother the originals of the papers regarding the uncle's will and letters written by the mother. Rigaud murders Ephraim to obtain the box of documents.

Development of the novel
The character Little Dorrit (Amy) was inspired by Mary Ann Cooper (née Mitton), whom Dickens sometimes visited along with her family, and called by that name. They lived in The Cedars, a house on Hatton Road west of London; its site is now under the east end of London Heathrow Airport. This model for Little Dorrit, and the development of the plot, is contested by others.

Significance and reception

Like much of Dickens's later fiction, this novel has seen many reversals of critical fortune. It has been shown to be a critique of HM Treasury and the blunders that led to the loss of life of 360 British soldiers at the Battle of Balaclava. Imprisonment – both literal and figurative – is a major theme of the novel, with Clennam and the Meagles quarantined in Marseilles, Rigaud jailed for murder, Mrs Clennam confined to her house, the Dorrits imprisoned in the Marshalsea, and most of the characters trapped within the rigidly defined English social class structure of the time.

Tchaikovsky, a voracious reader and theatre-goer when he was not composing, was entranced by the book.

Franz Kafka, a great admirer of Dickens, sent a copy to Felice Bauer. " Yesterday I sent you Little Dorrit. You know it well. How could we forget Dickens. It's probably not a good read in its entirety with the children, but parts of it will certainly give you and them great pleasure."

The American critic Anne Stevenson speaks of Little Dorrit as "a wonderful read – a tragical-comical-satirical-poetical mystery story that turns out to be an allegory of love. She praises the characterization of the "major characters" (Arthur Clenham, Mr Dorrit, Little Dorrit), but sees others as "a cast of puppets that the master showman can't help but tag with formulaic phrases … Each character's name is a guide to the entertainment to be expected: the energetic Mr Pancks invariably rakes his hair upright and steams about like a tugboat; Mr Sparkler rants about "damn fine women with no nonsense about them"; Mr Flintwinch, with his wry neck and crooked necktie, perpetually screws himself into sinister corners."

Publication history
Little Dorrit was published in 19 monthly instalments, each consisting of 32 pages with two illustrations by Hablot Knight Browne whose pen name was Phiz. Each instalment cost a shilling except for the last, a double issue which cost two shillings.

Book One – Poverty
I – December 1855 (chapters 1–4)
II – January 1856 (chapters 5–8)
III – February 1856 (chapters 9–11)
IV – March 1856 (chapters 12–14)
V – April 1856 (chapters 15–18)
VI – May 1856 (chapters 19–22)
VII – June 1856 (chapters 23–25)
VIII – July 1856 (chapters 26–29)
IX – August 1856 (chapters 30–32)
X – September 1856 (chapters 33–36)

Book Two – Riches
XI – October 1856 (Chapters 1–4)
XII – November 1856 (Chapters 5–7)
XIII – December 1856 (chapters 8–11)
XIV – January 1857 (chapters 12–14)
XV – February 1857 (chapters 15–18)
XVI – March 1857 (Chapters 19–22)
XVII – April 1857 (Chapters 23–26)
XVIII – May 1857 (Chapters 27–29)
XIX-XX – June 1857 (Chapters 30–34)

The novel was then issued as a book by Bradbury and Evans in 1857.

Adaptations
Little Dorrit has been adapted for the screen five times, the first three in 1913, 1920, and 1934. The 1934 German adaptation, Kleine Dorrit, starred Anny Ondra as Little Dorrit and Mathias Wieman as Arthur Clennam. It was directed by Karel Lamač. The fourth adaptation, in 1987, was a UK feature film of the same title as the novel, directed by Christine Edzard and starring Alec Guinness as William Dorrit and Derek Jacobi as Arthur Clennam, supported by a cast of over 300 British actors.

The fifth adaptation was a TV series co-produced by the BBC and WGBH Boston, written by Andrew Davies and featuring Claire Foy (as Little Dorrit), Andy Serkis (as Rigaud/Blandois), Matthew Macfadyen (as Arthur Clennam), Tom Courtenay (as William Dorrit), Judy Parfitt (as Mrs Clennam), and Alun Armstrong (as Jeremiah/Ephraim Flintwinch). The series aired between October and December 2008 in the UK, in the USA on PBS's Masterpiece in April 2009, and in Australia, on ABC1 TV, in June and July 2010.

In 2001 BBC Radio 4 broadcast a radio adaptation of five hour-long episodes, starring Sir Ian McKellen as the narrator.

Little Dorrit forms the backdrop to Peter Ackroyd's debut novel, The Great Fire of London (1982).

Dickens's story provided inspiration for the web comic The Adventures of Dorrit Little by artist Monica McKelvey Johnson.

References

External links

Online editions
 Little Dorrit read online at Bookwise
 
Little Dorrit at Internet Archive.

1857 British novels
British novels adapted into films
British novels adapted into television shows
Bureaucracy in fiction
English novels
Female characters in literature
Fiction set in 1826
Literary characters introduced in 1857
Marshalsea
Novels by Charles Dickens
Novels first published in serial form
Novels set in London
Novels set in Marseille
Novels set in prison
Novels set in Rome
Novels set in the 1820s
Novels set in Venice
Victorian novels
Uxoricide in fiction